Mark A. Nook is the 11th president of the University of Northern Iowa. Prior to this, he was the chancellor of Montana State University Billings.

Education 
Mark Nook was born in Estherville, Iowa and graduated from Holstein Community School in Holstein, Iowa. He holds a bachelor's degree in physics and mathematics from Southwest Minnesota State University, a master's degree in astrophysics from Iowa State University, and a Ph.D in astronomy from the University of Wisconsin–Madison.

Career 
Nook began teaching physics and astronomy at Concordia College in 1983, where he was an instructor until 1986. Following this, he worked on the Wisconsin Ultraviolet Photo-Polarimeter Experiment until 1991. After receiving his doctorate degree, Nook became an assistant professor of physics and astronomy at St. Cloud State University, eventually becoming a full professor in 1998. He served in this position until 2007. He served as the chair of the department of physics, astronomy, and engineering science from 1999 to 2004.  He additionally served as the dean of undergraduate studies from 2004 to 2007. From 2007 to 2009, and again from 2010 to 2011, he was the provost and vice chancellor for academic affairs at University of Wisconsin-Stevens Point, acting as the interim chancellor 2009 to 2010. Nook served as the senior vice president for academic and student affairs for the University of Wisconsin System from 2011 to 2014. In 2014 Nook became the chancellor of Montana State University Billings, serving in that role until January 2017. He currently serves as the president of the University of Northern Iowa. He was inducted into Omicron Delta Kappa at the University of Northern Iowa as a faculty/staff initiate in 2017.

References 

   
     
     
     

Living people
University of Northern Iowa faculty
University of Wisconsin–Madison College of Letters and Science alumni
Iowa State University alumni
Southwest Minnesota State University alumni
People from Estherville, Iowa
Educators from Iowa
Year of birth missing (living people)